This is a list of computers with on-board BASIC. They shipped standard with a version of BASIC that was installed in the computer. The computers can access the BASIC language without the user inserting cartridges or loading software from external media.

BASICs with Bitwise Ops use -1 as true and the AND and OR operators perform a bitwise operation on the arguments.

FOR/NEXT skip means that body of the loop is skipped if the initial value of the loop times the sign of the step exceeds the final value times the sign of the step (such as 2 TO 1 STEP 1 or 1 TO 2 STEP -1).  The statements inside the FOR/NEXT loop will not be executed at all.

Numeric support indicates if a BASIC supports Integers and/or Floating Point.

Variable Name Length is how many characters of a variable name are used to determine uniqueness.

Full tokenization means that all keywords are converted to tokens and all extra space characters are removed. Partial tokenization leaves extra space characters in the source. None means that no tokenization is done. How to test for full tokenization:

10 PRINT         "HELLO"
LIST

If it is fully tokenized it should return 10 PRINT "HELLO" without all the extra spaces that were entered.

References

On-Board Basic